Robin Sundin (born 28 June 1983) is a Swedish bandy player who plays for Hammarby IF as a midfielder.

Career
After playing for Örebro SK, BS BolticGöta and Hammarby IF, before leaving to play Uralsky Trubnik in Russia in 2007. The club suffered from financial difficulties, which meant that Sundin returned to Hammarby IF a year later together with his teammates Jesper Ericsson and Kalle Spjuth. 

He won the Swedish championship with Hammarby IF in 2010 and 2013.

Honours

Club
Hammarby IF
Swedish Championship:  2010, 2013
World Cup: 2009
Svenska Cupen: 2013, 2014

References

External links
 
 

1983 births
Living people
Swedish bandy players
Expatriate bandy players in Russia
Swedish expatriate sportspeople in Russia
Örebro SK Bandy players
IF Boltic players
Hammarby IF Bandy players
Uralsky Trubnik players
Sweden international bandy players
Sportspeople from Örebro